Areguni is a village in the Vardenis Municipality of the Gegharkunik Province of Armenia.

Etymology 
The village was known as Satanakhach until 1935, and earlier as Gyuney.

Gallery

References

External links 
 
 

Populated places in Gegharkunik Province